Bernd Herrmann (born 22 November 1951) was a West German athlete who competed mainly in the 400 metres.

He competed for West Germany at the 1976 Summer Olympics held in Montreal, Quebec, Canada where he won the bronze medal in the men's 4 x 400 metre relay with his teammates Franz-Peter Hofmeister, Lothar Krieg and Harald Schmid. He also competed at the 1972 Summer Olympics.

References

External links
 European Championships

1951 births
West German male sprinters
Olympic bronze medalists for West Germany
Athletes (track and field) at the 1972 Summer Olympics
Athletes (track and field) at the 1976 Summer Olympics
Olympic athletes of West Germany
Living people
European Athletics Championships medalists
Medalists at the 1976 Summer Olympics
Olympic bronze medalists in athletics (track and field)
Universiade bronze medalists for West Germany
Universiade medalists in athletics (track and field)
Medalists at the 1973 Summer Universiade